Synstrophus is a genus of polypore fungus beetles in the family Tetratomidae. There are at least two described species in Synstrophus.

Species
These two species belong to the genus Synstrophus:
 Synstrophus repandus (Horn, 1888)
 Synstrophus rollei Pic, 1910

References

Further reading

External links

 

Tenebrionoidea
Articles created by Qbugbot